Jack London Lake is a  mountain lake located in the Yagodninsky District of Magadan Oblast, Russia.

It was named in 1932 in honor of American writer, journalist and socialist activist Jack London by Russian geologist P. Skornyakov, following the wish of Yuri Bilibin, the head of the first geological expedition to Kolyma, who had expressed the idea to name one of the yet unnamed geographical locations in the Far Northeast after the writer.

Geography

The outflow is the Kiuyel-Sien, a Kolyma River tributary. 

The lake contains four islands. There is a weather station on Vera Island. The area of the lake is part of the Jack London Lake Nature Park, a protected area (national park).

See also
List of lakes of Russia

References

External links

Lakes of Magadan Oblast
Landforms of Siberia
Tourist attractions in Magadan Oblast
Jack London